Lanning is a surname. Notable people with the surname include:

Andy Lanning, British comic book writer and artist
Dave Lanning, English sports commentator
Frank Lanning (1872–1945), American silent film actor
Jim Lanning, American wrestler
Joel Lanning (born 1994), American football player
Johnny Lanning (1910–1989), baseball player
Justin Lanning, British ice dancer
Justin Lanning (musician), American singer-songwriter
Lauren Lanning, American beauty queen
Lorne Lanning, American game designer, writer, voice actor and animated film director
William M. Lanning (1849–1912), American Republican politician

Fictional characters
Alfred Lanning, a character in Isaac Asimov's Robot series